"Gin and Juice" is a song by American rapper Snoop Dogg. It was released on January 18, 1994, as the second single from his debut album, Doggystyle.

Lyrics 
The lyrics depict a party filled with sex, marijuana, and alcohol continuing into the small hours of the morning. The iconic chorus, sung by David Ruffin Jr (D-Ruff), the son of former Temptation David Ruffin  is:
Rollin' down the street smokin' indo
Sippin' on gin and juice
Laid back (with my mind on my money and my money on my mind).

One critic describes the chorus as representative of "the G-funk tableau" emphasizing cruising culture, consumption of depressants, and materialism. The last line is an example of antimetabole, the figure of speech in which two or more clauses are related to each other through a reversal of structures. The focus on money is shared throughout hip hop, including It's All About the Benjamins, Money Makes the World Go Round, Get Money, and Foe tha Love of $.

Production 
"Gin and Juice" was produced by Dr. Dre and contains an interpolation from Slave's "Watching You" in its chorus and a sample from George McCrae's "I Get Lifted" as its bassline; additional vocalists on the song include Dat Nigga Daz, Jewell, Heney Loc, and Sean "Barney" Thomas.

Release and reception 
"Gin and Juice" peaked at number eight on the Billboard Hot 100 in the United States. It earned a gold certification from the RIAA and sold 700,000 copies.

"Gin and Juice" was nominated for the 1995 Grammy Award for Best Rap Solo Performance. It was listed as number eight on VH1's 100 Greatest Hip-Hop Songs.

Music video 
The song's music video, directed by Dr. Dre, Calvin Caday and Anita Sisaath, also producers of 2Pac's "Dear Mama", features a teenaged Snoop Dogg throwing a wild house party after his parents leave. His parents return home angry and evict the partygoers to confront Snoop Dogg. Ricky Harris plays Snoop's father, and Dr. Dre, Warren G, Nate Dogg and Daz Dillinger make cameo appearances. Six-year-old rapper Lil Bow Wow plays Snoop's little brother who is jumping on the couch in the intro. "I was in the 'Gin and Juice' video," comedian Eddie Griffin recalled. "I pop out of this little Volkswagen full of weed smoke with my hair standing on end."

The small-budget idea was later re-purposed in videos such as J-Kwon's "Tipsy" and Oowee's "Why Cry", which features Snoop and is a shot-by-shot remake of the "Gin and Juice" video. The music video was parodied in the video for "DPG/K", where Snoop, carried on the front of a bicycle by Daz, gets hit by a car driven by B.G. Knocc Out and Dresta, two of Eazy-E's protégés with whom Snoop Dogg and Dr. Dre had feuds at the time.

In April 2005, the video was fourth on MTV2 and XXL's list of the 25 Greatest West Coast Videos. Snoop Dogg wears hockey jerseys of the now-defunct Springfield Indians of the American Hockey League and Pittsburgh Penguins (with the name and number 'GIN AND JUICE' 94 on the back) in the video.

Track listing 
 12-inch single
 "Gin and Juice" (Radio Version) (No Indo)
 "Gin and Juice" (Radio Version)
 "Gin and Juice" (Laid Back Remix)
 "Gin and Juice" (Laid Back Radio Mix)

Charts

Weekly charts

Year-end charts

Certifications

Release history

Covers 
"Gin and Juice" has been covered by other groups, including alternative country group the Gourds in 1996, lounge singer Richard Cheese in 2004, comedians Naked Trucker and T-Bones in 2007 and singer and actor Paul Simon in 2010, during the Night of Too Many Stars event hosted by Jon Stewart. In 2004, a radio edit version of the song (used because the original version had explicit lyrics not suitable for television at the time) was played by a group of homeless drug addicts on the radio as they mock the pompous Dr. Stegman on the ABC miniseries Kingdom Hospital by horror novelist Stephen King. The song was the cover version sung by The Gourds eight years prior to the miniseries' syndication.

See also 
 List of Billboard Hot 100 top 10 singles in 1994
 Paradise (cocktail)

References 

 
 
 (April 2005). XXL Magazine No. 68. Boulder, Colorado: Harris Publications.

1993 songs
1994 singles
Snoop Dogg songs
Songs about driving under the influence
Songs about cannabis
Song recordings produced by Dr. Dre
Songs written by Snoop Dogg
Songs written by Harry Wayne Casey
Songs written by Dr. Dre
Death Row Records singles
Interscope Records singles